This Is Not A Dream is an album by New Zealand band Dadamah. It was originally released on vinyl by the Majora label in 1992, and later re-released on CD by Kranky label in 1995. The CD compiles the material they recorded for Majora; the original 6-track LP and two 7"s.

Track listing

Personnel 
Adapted from the This Is Not a Dream liner notes.
Dadamah
 Roy Montgomery – guitar, vocals
 Kim Pieters – bass guitar, vocals, engineering, illustrations
 Janine Stagg – organ
 Peter Stapleton – drums

Release history

References

External links 
 
 Profile at Kranky website

1992 albums
Dadamah albums
Kranky albums